Suca is a genus of antlions belonging to the family Myrmeleontidae.

The species of this genus are found in Southern Africa.

Species:

Suca delicata 
Suca satura

References

Myrmeleontidae